Skuseomyia is a genus of crane fly in the family Limoniidae.

Distribution
Queensland & New South Wales, Australia.

Species
S. eximia (Osten Sacken, 1860)

References

Limoniidae
Diptera of Australasia